Vamping is a 1984 American drama film about a down-on-his-luck saxophonist who agrees to help rob the home of a rich widow, then unexpectedly falls for the woman. Shots of the movie were filmed in Buffalo, New York, including inside the old Buffalo Central Terminal.

Cast
Patrick Duffy - Harry Baranski
 Catherine Hyland - Diane Anderson
Rod Arrants - Raymond O' Brien
Fred A. Keller - Fat Man
Polli Magaro - Waitress
David Booze - Benjamin
Jed Cooper - Lennie
Steven Gilborn - Jimmy  
John McCurry - Sam
Wendel Meldrum - Rita  
Henry Stram - Deacon  
Natalia Nogulich - Julie  
Rajmund Fleszar - Old Man
Frank O'Hara - Old Man  
Isabel Price - Matron
Lambros Touris- Huge Man

External links

1984 films
1984 drama films
American drama films
1980s English-language films
1980s American films